Island Lake is a lake in Beltrami County, Minnesota, in the United States.

Island Lake was named for the lake island it contains.

See also
List of lakes in Minnesota

References

Lakes of Minnesota
Lakes of Beltrami County, Minnesota